Wolfgang Klein (28 January 1941 – 15 September 2017) was a German athlete. He competed in the men's long jump at the 1964 Summer Olympics. He later became a lawyer and served as the president of the football club Hamburger SV between 1979 and 1987.

References

1941 births
2017 deaths
Athletes (track and field) at the 1964 Summer Olympics
German male long jumpers
Olympic athletes of the United Team of Germany
Place of birth missing
Sportspeople from Hanover
Universiade silver medalists for West Germany
Universiade medalists in athletics (track and field)
German football chairmen and investors
Medalists at the 1963 Summer Universiade
20th-century German lawyers